Selachops is a genus of flies belonging to the family Agromyzidae.

The species of this genus are found in Europe.

Species:
 Selachops flavocincta Wahlberg, 1844 
 Selachops intiba Zlobin, 1983

References

Agromyzidae
Brachycera genera